Kananaskis Improvement District is an improvement district in Alberta, Canada. It is located within Alberta's Rockies, sharing much of its boundaries with Kananaskis Country.

The administrative centre of the improvement district is Kananaskis Village.

History 
The following is the incorporation history of Kananaskis Improvement District.
April 1, 1945 – Improvement District (I.D.) No. 161, I.D. No. 192, and a portion of I.D. No. 193 amalgamated to form I.D. No. 33
January 1, 1969 – I.D. No. 33 amalgamated with I.D. No. 27 to form I.D. No. 6, while adjacent I.D. No. 46 and I.D. No. 50 amalgamated to form I.D. No. 8
January 1, 1983 – portions of I.D. No. 6 and portions of I.D. No. 8 amalgamated to form I.D. No. 5
April 1, 1996 – the name of I.D. No. 5 changed to Kananaskis Improvement District

Geography

Communities and localities 
There are no communities located within Kananaskis Improvement District.

The following localities are located within Kananaskis Improvement District.
Localities

Bow Valley Park
Camp Horizon
Kananaskis Village
Kovach
Mount Kidd RV Park
Seebe

Climate 
Kananaskis experiences a subarctic climate (Köppen climate classification Dfc).

Demographics 

Government 
Like all improvements districts in Alberta, Kananaskis Improvement District is administered by Alberta Municipal Affairs. However, residents do elect an advisory council consisting of a chairperson and three councillors to oversee the activities of municipal staff.

28th G8 Summit in Canada 

On June 26 and June 27, 2002, the area hosted the 28th G8 Summit. This annual "Group of 8" Summit was held in Kananaskis Village at the Kananaskis Resort (also called the "Delta Lodge at Kananaskis"). This was the second time Canada used a lodge venue for the G8 Summit, after its inaugural 7th G7 Summit at Montebello, Quebec in 1981. So far, it is the only G8 Summit to be held in western Canada. The 2002 conference pumped some $300-million into the Kananaskis and Alberta economy; however, security cost taxpayers in excess of $200-million.

See also 
List of communities in Alberta

References

External links 

 
1983 establishments in Alberta
Improvement districts in Alberta